Senator Walz may refer to:

Lynne Walz (fl. 2010s), Nebraska State Senate
Norman Joseph Walz (1915–1984), Minnesota State Senate

See also
Brent Waltz (born 1973), Indiana State Senate